Novion was an Australian Real Estate Investment Trust which invested in shopping centres across Australia.

It was listed on the Australian Securities Exchange in October 1994 by John Gandel under the name Gandel Retail Trust' with six retail assets. It was managed by Colonial First State, based in Sydney, under the name CFS Retail Property Trust until 2013, when it separated. It was renamed Novion in November 2014.

Novion merged with Federation Limited in June 2015, to become Vicinity Centres.

Properties
As at June 2015, Novion owned had shareholdings in 36 shopping centres.

Australian Capital Territory

15 Bowes Street, Bowden

New South Wales
Bathurst City Centre
Chatswood Chase
DFO Homebush
Lake Haven Shopping Centre
Lidcombe Shopping Centre

Victoria
Altona Gate
Bayside
Broadmeadows Central
Chadstone Shopping Centre
Corio Shopping Centre
DFO Essendon
DFO Moorabbin
DFO South Wharf (75%)
Emporium Melbourne (50%)
Forest Hill Chase
Gateway Plaza, Leopold
Myer Bourke Street (33%)
Northland Shopping Centre (50%)
Roxburgh Village

Queensland
Clifford Gardens
Grand Plaza Shopping Centre (50%)
Myer Centre, Brisbane (50%)
QueensPlaza
Runaway Bay Shopping Village (50%)

South Australia
Castle Plaza
Elizabeth Shopping Centre

Tasmania
Eastlands
Northgate

Western Australia
Rockingham Shopping Centre

References

Companies based in Sydney
Companies formerly listed on the Australian Securities Exchange
Real estate companies established in 1994
Real estate companies disestablished in 2015
Real estate investment trusts of Australia
1994 establishments in Australia
2015 disestablishments in Australia